Leesburg Township is one of the fourteen townships of Union County, Ohio, United States.  The 2010 census found 1,414 people in the township, 268 of whom lived in the village of Magnetic Springs.

Geography
Located in the eastern part of the county, it borders the following townships:
Claibourne Township - north
Thompson Township, Delaware County - northeast
Scioto Township, Delaware County - southeast
Dover Township - south
Paris Township - southwest
Taylor Township - west

The village of Magnetic Springs is located in northeastern Leesburg Township.

Name and history
Leesburg Township was organized in 1825. It is the only Leesburg Township statewide.

Government
The township is governed by a three-member board of trustees, who are elected in November of odd-numbered years to a four-year term beginning on the following January 1. Two are elected in the year after the presidential election and one is elected in the year before it. There is also an elected township fiscal officer, who serves a four-year term beginning on April 1 of the year after the election, which is held in November of the year before the presidential election. Vacancies in the fiscal officership or on the board of trustees are filled by the remaining trustees.

References

External links
County website

Townships in Union County, Ohio
Townships in Ohio